This is a list of seasons played by R.S.C. Anderlecht in Belgian and European football since they first played in official competitions in 1909.

References

Seasons
 
Anderlecht